Friedrich Wilhelm Eugen Karl Hugo, Prince of Hohenlohe-Öhringen, Duke of Ujest (27 May 1816 – 23 August 1897) (German: Fürst zu Hohenlohe-Oehringen, Herzog von Ujest) was a German nobleman, politician, mining industrialist and general in the armies of the kingdom of Württemberg and the kingdom of Prussia.

Early life
A hereditary prince of the House of Hohenlohe, he was born in Stuttgart on 27 May 1816. He was the son of August, Prince of Hohenlohe-Öhringen.

His paternal grandparents were Frederick Louis, Prince of Hohenlohe-Ingelfingen and Countess Maria Amalie von Hoym. His uncle was Prince Adolf zu Hohenlohe-Ingelfingen, who briefly served as Minister-President of Prussia in 1862 and was succeeded by Otto von Bismarck,  and his cousin was Prince Kraft zu Hohenlohe-Ingelfingen.

Career

His grandfather, Frederick Louis, had acquired the estates of Slawentzitz, Ujest and Bitschin in Silesia by marriage in 1782, an area of 108 square miles. Hugo inherited these lands, besides his Franconian properties Öhringen and Neuenstein, and established calamine mines. He also founded one of the largest zinc smelting plants in the world. The Prussian king, William I, later German Emperor, created him Duke of Ujest upon his coronation in 1861.

Personal life
Prince Hugo married Pauline Wilhelmine of Fürstenberg, youngest child of Amalie of Baden and Charles Egon II, Prince of Fürstenberg, in 1847. Together, they were the parents of:

 Christian Kraft Herzog zu Hohenlohe-Öhringen (1848–1926), who married Otilie Lubraniec-Dąmbski.
 Marie Filicitas Maria zu Hohenlohe-Öhringen (1849–1929), who married Heinrich XIX, Prince Reuss of Köstritz.
 Luise Luise zu Hohenlohe-Öhringen (1851–1920), who married Friedrich Ludwig Count von Frankenberg und Ludwigsdorff.
 August Karl August zu Hohenlohe-Öhringen (1854–1884), who died unmarried.
 Friedrich Karl zu Hohenlohe-Öhringen (1855–1910), who married Countess Marie von Hatzfeld, a daughter of Count Paul von Hatzfeldt.
 Hans Heinrich Georg Herzog zu Hohenlohe-Oehringen (1858–1945), who married Princess Gertrud Auguste Mathilde Olga von Hohenlohe-Öhringen.
 Max Anthon Karl zu Hohenlohe-Öhringen (1860–1922), who married Countess Helene "Nelly" von Hatzfeld, a daughter of Count Paul von Hatzfeldt.
 Hugo Friedrich zu Hohenlohe-Öhringen (1864–1928), who married Helga Hager.
 Margaret zu Hohenlohe-Öhringen (1865-1940) married William of Hohenzollern, Count of Hohenau (1854-1930), son of Prince Albert of Prussia.

Hugo died at Sławięcice Palace (Schloss Slawentzitz) on 23 August 1897.

Honours

Gallery

References

1816 births
1897 deaths
Hugo
German industrialists
German landowners
German mining businesspeople
Free Conservative Party politicians
Members of the Reichstag of the German Empire
Recipients of the Iron Cross (1870), 2nd class
Recipients of the Order of St. Anna, 2nd class